Theodore Joans (July 4, 1928 – April 25, 2003) was an American jazz poet, surrealist, trumpeter, and painter, who from the 1960s spent periods of time travelling in Europe and Africa. His work stands at the intersection of several avant-garde streams and some have seen in it a precursor to the orality of the spoken-word movement. However, he criticized the competitive aspect of "slam" poetry. Joans is known for his motto: "Jazz is my religion, and Surrealism is my point of view". He was the author of more than 30 books of poetry, prose, and collage, among them Black Pow-Wow, Beat Funky Jazz Poems, Afrodisia, Jazz is Our Religion, Double Trouble, WOW and Teducation.

Biography
Joans was born in Cairo, Illinois, as Theodore Jones. His parents worked on the riverboats that plied the Ohio and Mississippi rivers. He played the trumpet and was an avid jazz aficionado, following Bop as it developed, and continued to espouse jazz of all styles and eras throughout his life. Growing up in Fort Wayne, Indiana, and Louisville, Kentucky, he earned a degree in fine arts from Indiana University, before moving in 1951 to New York City.

In New York, he painted in a style he dubbed Jazz Action and read his poetry, developing a personal style of oral delivery called Jazz Poetry. He was a participant in the Beat Generation in Greenwich Village. He was a contemporary and friend of Jack Kerouac and Allen Ginsberg, Leroi Jones (later known as Amiri Baraka), Gregory Corso, Diane Di Prima, Bob Kaufman, Lawrence Ferlinghetti and others. Joans shared a room for a time with the great jazz musician Charlie Parker. Joans' bohemian costume balls and rent parties were photographed by Fred McDarrah and Weegee.

Joans was also deeply involved in Surrealism, meeting Joseph Cornell, and at first becoming close to his childhood hero Salvador Dalí, then soon breaking with him. In Paris, Joans was welcomed into the circle of André Breton. Joans was an erudite africanist and traveled extensively throughout the continent, frequently on foot, over many decades between periods in Europe and North America, choosing to lead an increasingly expatriate life. As publisher John Calder noted, "Joans adapted himself to the lifestyles of artists in Harlem and Greenwich Village, the London of the 1950s and 60s, the Paris of the 60s to the 90s, as well as to those of other European cities and Timbuktu, in Mali, where he spent many winters." From the 1960s onward, Joans had a house in Tangier, Morocco, and then in Timbuktu. While he ceased playing the trumpet, he maintained a jazz sensibility in the reading of his poems and frequently collaborated with musicians. He continued to travel and maintained an active correspondence with a host of creative individuals, among them Langston Hughes, Michel Leiris, Aimé Césaire, Robert Creeley, Jayne Cortez, Stokely Carmichael, Ishmael Reed and Paul Bowles, Franklin and Penelope Rosemont; many of these letters are collected at the Bancroft Library of the University of California Berkeley. The University of Delaware houses his correspondence with Charles Henri Ford. Joans was also a close correspondent/participant of the Chicago Surrealist Group.

Joans' painting Bird Lives hangs in the De Young Museum in San Francisco. He was also the originator of the "Bird Lives" legend and graffiti in New York City after the death of Charlie Parker in March 1955. Joans visual art work spans collages, assemblage objects, paintings and drawings including many resulting from the collaborative surrealist game Cadavre Exquis. The rhinoceros is a frequent subject in his work in all media. He also created short Super 8 film works.

During the early 1980s Joans was a writer in residence in Berlin, Germany, under the auspices of the DAAD (Deutsche Akademische Austauschdienst) program. He was a contributor of jazz essays and reviews to magazines such as Coda and Jazz Magazine. His autobiographical text "Je Me Vois" appeared in the Contemporary Authors Autobiographical Series, Volume 25, published by Gale Research. His work has been included in numerous anthologies, including The Poetry of the Negro, 1746–1970 (1970), edited by Langston Hughes and Arna Bontemps (1970), A Broadside Treasury, edited by Gwendolyn Brooks (1971), and For Malcolm, edited by Dudley Randall and Margaret Taylor Goss Burroughs (1973).

In the late 1990s Joans relocated to Seattle and resided there and in Vancouver, between travels, until his death. He was the recipient of the American Book Awards Lifetime Achievement Award in 2001, from the Before Columbus Foundation.

Ted Joans died in Vancouver, British Columbia, due to complications from diabetes. He had 10 children and named one of his daughters Daline, after Salvador Dalí.

Published works
Funky Jazz Poems (1959), New York: Rhino Review.
Beat Poems (1959), New York: Deretchink.
All of Ted Joans and No More(1961), with collages by the author, New York: Excelsior Press.
The Truth (1960)
The Hipsters with collages by the author (1961), New York: Corinth.
A Black Pow-Wow Of Jazz Poems (1969), London: Marion Boyars Publishers Ltd.
Black Pow-Wow Jazz Poems (1969), New York: Hill and Wang.
Afrodisia (1970), with collages by the author, London: Marion Boyars Publishers Ltd.
Afrodisia; New Poems (1970), New York: Hill and Wang.
A Black Manifesto in Jazz Poetry and Prose (1971), London: Calder and Boyars.
Cogollo Caniculaire (1977), with artist Heriberto Cogollo and poet Joyce Mansour, Rome (Italy): Carlo Bestetti.
Flying Piranha (1978), with poet Joyce Mansour, New York: Bola Press.
Der Erdferkelforscher / The Aardvark Watcher (1980), translated by Richard Anders, Berlin: LCB-Editionen.
Vergriffen: oder Blitzlieb Poems (1979), Kassel (Germany): Loose Blätter Press.
Mehr Blitzliebe Poems (1982), Hamburg (Germany): Michael Kellner Verlag.
Merveilleux Coup de Foudre (1982) with poet Jayne Cortez, in French, translated by Ms. Ila Errus and M. Sila Errus, Paris: Handshake Editions.
Sure, Really I Is (1982), with collages by the author, Sidmouth (UK): Transformaction.
Dies und Das: Ein Magazin von actuellem surrealistischen interesse (1984), Berlin.
Double Trouble (1991), with poet Hart Leroy Bibbs, Paris: Revue Noire, Editions Bleu Outremer.
Honeyspoon (1993), Paris: Handshake Editions.
Okapi Passion (1994), Oakland: Ishmael Reed Publishing Company.
WOW (1998), with artist Laura Corsiglia, Mukilteo (Washington): Quartermoon Press.
Teducation: Selected Poems 1949-1999 (1999), illustrations by Heriberto Cogollo, Minneapolis: Coffee House Press.
Select one or more: Poems (2000), Berkeley: The Bancroft Library Press.
Our Thang: Several Poems, Several Drawings (2001), with artist Laura Corsiglia, Victoria (Canada): Ekstasis Editions.
In Thursday Sane (2001), with illustrations by the author, Davis (California): Swan Scythe Press.

Essays about Ted Joans
Michel Fabre, "Ted Joans: the Surrealist Griot" in From Harlem to Paris: Black American Writers in France 1840–1980, University of Illinois, 1991.
Robert Elliot Fox, "Ted Joans and the (b)reach of the African American literary canon", in MELUS, Vol. 29, nos 3/4 (Fall/Winter 2004), Gale Literature Resource Center.
Joanna Pawlik, "Ted Joans' surrealist history lesson", in International Journal of Francophone Studies, Vol. 14, issue 1 & 2 (2011). doi: 10.1386/ijfs.14.1&2.221_1

Ted Joans in film
 (1964) by Louis van Gasteren, Amsterdam. Ted Joans reads with Piet Kuiters Modern Jazz Group, excerpt on YouTube.
Pan-African Cultural Festival / Festival panafricain d'Alger (1969) by William Klein, France/Algeria. Features Ted Joans reading with Archie Shepp and Touareg musicians.
 (1971), directed by John Jeremy with the photographs of Val Wilmer. Features Ted Joans' voice reading one of his signature poems, "Jazz is My Religion".
 (1994) at Jack Kerouac conference, New York University.
From St. Louis to Dogon Country (1999) part of the BBC series Great Railway Journeys. directed by David Hickman, written by Danny Glover. Features Joans and Danny Glover, Clyde Taylor and others in Mali.
WOW! Ted Joans Lives! by Kurt Hemmer and Tom Knoff (2010). An homage to Ted Joans, featuring his reading at Harper College, Palatine, Illinois, in 2002.

Further reading

Yuko Otomo, "Let's get TEDucated! Tribute to Ted Joans", ARTEDOLIA, June 2015.
Ted Joans tribute at Milk
"Bird and the Beats", by Ted Joans

 "The Teducated Mouth", Ted Joans interview by John Barbato, Oaxaca (interview was conducted in November 2002 and originally published in Zocalo in summer 2003); in Empty Mirror magazine. 
 Ted Joans interview on NPR, All Things Considered with Marcie Sillman, 2001.

 Review of Teducation and WOW by Jack Foley in Konch magazine.
 Karima Boudou, "Beauford Delaney and Ted Joans", Africanah: Arena for Contemporary African, African-American and Caribbean Art, April 28, 2018.

References

External links
Ted Joans website. Bibliography, books, biography, art, videos, and resources
"Ted Joans Lives! A Tribute". Ted Joans information, news & resources at Empty Mirror.

Guide to the Ted Joans papers at The Bancroft Library, University of California
Charles Henri Ford letters to Ted Joans collection held by Special Collections, University of Delaware
Material related to Ted Joans in "Beats Visions and the Counterculture" (online exhibition) at Special Collections, University of Delaware
Jonathon Keats, "An Eye-Opening Met Exhibit Shows The Full Gamut Of Surrealist Art From Asia To Africa To North And South America", Forbes, October 30, 2021.

1928 births
2003 deaths
20th-century African-American painters
20th-century American male artists
20th-century American male musicians
20th-century American male writers
20th-century American musicians
20th-century American painters
20th-century American poets
20th-century trumpeters
21st-century African-American artists
21st-century American male artists
21st-century American painters
African-American male writers
African-American musicians
African-American poets
American Book Award winners
American jazz trumpeters
American male jazz musicians
American male painters
American male poets
American male trumpeters
American surrealist writers
Beat Generation writers
Deaths from diabetes
Jazz musicians from Illinois
People from Cairo, Illinois
American expatriates in France
American expatriates in Morocco
American expatriates in England
American expatriates in Mali